General elections were held in the Bahamas on 7 May 2012. They were the first general election in which a third party (the Democratic National Alliance) offered a full slate of candidates alongside the two major parties, the Free National Movement and the Progressive Liberal Party (PLP). The result was a victory for the opposition PLP, whose leader Perry Christie became prime minister.

Background
The Free National Movement had defeated the Progressive Liberal Party in the 2007 general election amid a scandal involving the residency status of model and reality television star Anna Nicole Smith and allegations that the PLP's then-immigration minister had fast-tracked her application to live in the islands.

Opinion polls
An opinion poll was carried out by Public Domain, a market research and public opinion polling company, between 2 and 12 March 2012 that involved 501 respondents. A sample of this proportion only represented a maximum margin of error of 4.4 per cent. The poll showed that the Free National Movement's (FNM) core support was the highest at 30.5 per cent, followed by the Progressive Liberal Party (PLP) at 23.7 per cent, and the Democratic National Alliance (DNA) at 16.5 per cent. A total of 12.2 per cent of the sample were undecided voters. Also the poll revealed that the PLP's swing voters constituted 6.6 per cent of the sample; the largest swing voter percentage. They were followed by the DNA ( who had 5.2 per cent swing voters ) and the FNM ( who had 3.7 per cent swing voters ). Therefore, the total support for the FNM was around 34.2 per cent, which was followed by the PLP's 30.3 per cent and the DNA's 21.7 per cent. If any of the two leading parties were to win the support of the entire 12.2 per cent undecided voters, they would win the general election. A question was asked during the polling process that went, According to you, which party will win the next election?. The results were that the FNM would ( at 32% ), the PLP would ( at 32% ) and the DNA would ( at 8% ) win the next general election. The poll also reported that 52% of the electorate was against reelecting the incumbent Free National Movement, while 55.9% opposed electing the PLP and 64.5% rejected electing the DNA.

Results
The opposition Progressive Liberal Party (PLP) won a majority in a landslide election victory, taking 30 of the 38 seats in parliament. PLP leader Perry Christie, who had previously served as Prime Minister, was sworn into office on 8 May 2012, at approximately 4 pm.

Outgoing Prime Minister Hubert Ingraham announced his retirement from politics following the defeat of his Free National Movement (FNM). He had served in Parliament for thirty-five years, winning re-election seven times, including 2012. Ingraham told supporters, "I gave it the best I could and now I've been rejected by the public of the Bahamas...We had no indication from the general public they would go that way." Ingraham then confirmed his retirement, saying, "I am going to go back to my little law office and enjoy life with my family."

The Democratic National Alliance lost the only seat it held in the prior parliament (that of Branville McCartney, its founder and only MP) and elected no candidates.

By constituency

References

External links
Nassau Guardian: 2012 Election results map of the Bahamas

Elections in the Bahamas
Bahamas
2012 in the Bahamas